Events in the year 2006 in Ukraine.

Incumbents 

 President: Viktor Yushchenko
 Prime Minister: Yuriy Yekhanurov (until 4 August), Viktor Yanukovych (from 4 August)

Events 

 22 August – Pulkovo Aviation Enterprise Flight 612, a scheduled passenger flight operated by Saint Petersburg-based airline Pulkovo Aviation Enterprise, flying from Anapa Airport to Pulkovo Airport in Saint Petersburg, crashes in Donetsk Oblast, near the Russian border, killing all 170 people on board.

Deaths

References 

 
Ukraine
Ukraine
2000s in Ukraine
Years of the 21st century in Ukraine